The beltline is a line representing the bottom edge of a vehicle's glass panels (e.g. windscreen, side windows and rear window). It also represents the bottom of a vehicle's greenhouse.

This definition is found on all cars, regardless of vehicle body style.

References 

Automotive styling features
Automotive body parts